The American Cinema Editors Award for Best Edited One Hour Series for Commercial Television, or the ACE Eddie Award, is an award presented by the American Cinema Editors to the best edited episodes of a one-hour series featured on broadcast or basic cable television. It is presented annually. The years denote when each episode first aired. The current eligibility period is the calendar year. The winners are highlighted.

Winners and nominees

2010s

American television awards